Babelomurex finchii, common name Finch's latiaxis, is a species of sea snail, a marine gastropod mollusc in the family Muricidae, the murex snails or rock snails.

Description
The shell size varies between 20 mm and 50 mm in maximum dimension.

Distribution
This species is distributed in the Pacific Ocean along Japan, Taiwan and the Philippines.

References

External links
 

finchii
Gastropods described in 1930